Pollanisus contrastus is a moth of the family Zygaenidae. It is found in Australia in south-eastern Queensland and New South Wales.

The length of the forewings is 6–7.5 mm for males and 6.5–7.5 mm for females. There are two generations per year.

External links
Australian Faunal Directory
Zygaenid moths of Australia: a revision of the Australian Zygaenidae

Moths of Australia
contrastus
Moths described in 2005